Carmen Sylvia Mathews (May 8, 1911 – August 31, 1995) was an American actress and environmentalist.

Biography
Mathews was born in Philadelphia. She studied first at Bennett Junior College and then in London at the Royal Academy of Dramatic Art.  She began her professional acting appearance with the Stratford-on-Avon Shakespearean Company before moving back to the United States.

Her Shakespearean roles included Ophelia in Hamlet and the Queen in Richard II.  Her film credits include Butterfield 8 (1960), A Rage to Live (1965), Rabbit, Run (1970), Sounder (1972), Top of the Hill (1980) and Daniel (1983). On television she performed on a wide variety of series over a span of four decades. A few of those series include appearances on six episodes of Alfred Hitchcock Presents (1955–65), as well as roles in a 1961 episode of The Twilight Zone, a 1964 episode of The Fugitive, and a 1972 episode of Cannon. One of her more memorable televised performances is as Colonel Lilian Rayborn on Episode 150 of M*A*S*H. Toward the end of her career, in 1990, she was cast in the Last Best Year with Mary Tyler Moore and Bernadette Peters.

In 1975, Mathews set up and ran a residential summer camp for disadvantaged children on her 100-acre farm in Redding, Connecticut.  Toward the end of her life, Mathews, a passionate environmentalist, made a perpetual donation of her 100-acre New Pond Farm to the Redding Land Trust, to ensure that it would retain its woods, fields, pond and marsh. The United Nations Association of the United States of America named Mathews one of Connecticut's outstanding women in 1987.

Death
Mathews died at her farm in Redding, Connecticut in 1995, aged 84, from undisclosed causes.

Filmography

References

External links
Carmen Mathews papers, 1921-1995, held by the Billy Rose Theatre Division, New York Public Library for the Performing Arts
New Pond Farm's page on Carmen Mathews
Remembering Carmen Mathews

1911 births
1995 deaths
Actresses from Philadelphia
American environmentalists
American women environmentalists
American stage actresses
American Shakespearean actresses
American film actresses
Bennett College (New York) alumni
Alumni of RADA
20th-century American actresses
People from Redding, Connecticut